Thomas Henry Cavanagh (29 June 1928 – 14 March 2007) was an English footballer and coach. As a player, he was an inside-forward at six professional clubs, most notably Huddersfield Town, Doncaster Rovers and was player manager at Cheltenham Town, where he was sacked as manager for swearing during matches after complaints by two supporters' club members.

Career 
After retiring as a player, Cavanagh coached and later managed Brentford. He coached at Nottingham Forest from 1966 until 1972. He then linked up with his former Preston teammate Tommy Docherty as a coach at Manchester United. During this time he worked with George Best, who notably bought him a white television for being late for training Cavanagh stayed at United when Docherty was sacked in 1977 and became assistant manager under Docherty's successor, Dave Sexton, but he left the club following Ron Atkinson's appointment in 1981. From 1976 to 1979 he was also Northern Ireland assistant manager to Danny Blanchflower. He later had a spell as coach at Newcastle United.

Ahead of the 1983 season, Cavanagh was hired as manager of Rosenborg. In Norwegian, the terms coach and manager are used interchangeably. Cavanagh had previously done an excellent job as coach at Manchester United, but lacked abilities in team selection, tactics and inspiration. He used players in the wrong position, and instructed the ball to be kicked over the midfield, making it impossible to use the playmaker. He believed in breaking down the players and then building them up, and was unarguably good at the former. By the summer, his style was costing the club players: Knut Torbjørn Eggen transferred to Orkanger in the Fourth Division, while Øivind Husby transferred to Brøndby in Denmark. Cavanagh was fired in August, at which time the club was second-last in the league, and Nils Arne Eggen took over as manager for the rest of the season. The team finished on a seventh place. President Erling Meirik withdrew as a consequence of the hiring, stating that in the future, the club should hire people based on more than their reputation and that they should seek judicial assistance with the contract.

In 1985, he became Martin Buchan's assistant at Burnley, and took over as manager when Buchan was sacked later that year. After leaving Burnley in 1986, he worked at the FA School of Excellence at Lilleshall until his retirement.

Personal life 
In 2002, Cavanagh was diagnosed with Alzheimer's disease and died in March 2007, aged 78. He was survived by his wife Doris; his five children, Lesley, Thomas, Deborah, Robert and Christine; and his four grandchildren, Alex, Eleanor, Faye and Mariella.

References 
Bibliography

Notes

External links 
 
 Manchester Evening News Obituary

1928 births
2007 deaths
Deaths from Alzheimer's disease
English footballers
Association football inside forwards
Preston North End F.C. players
Stockport County F.C. players
Huddersfield Town A.F.C. players
Doncaster Rovers F.C. players
Bristol City F.C. players
Carlisle United F.C. players
Cheltenham Town F.C. players
English football managers
Brentford F.C. managers
Newcastle United F.C. non-playing staff
Manchester United F.C. non-playing staff
Burnley F.C. managers
Cheltenham Town F.C. managers
Rosenborg BK managers
English Football League players
Footballers from Liverpool
Deaths from dementia in England